Shiki may refer to:

Places
Shiki District, Afghanistan
Shiki District, Nara, Japan
Shiki, Saitama, Japan
Shiki language
Shiki Theatre Company, a Japanese theatre company

People
Masaoka Shiki (1867–1902), a Japanese haiku and tanka poet
, Japanese manga artist
, Japanese actor, voice actor, model and fashion designer
, Japanese writer 
, Japanese racing cyclist

Fiction
Shiki (novel), a horror novel by Fuyumi Ono, adapted into a manga and anime series
Shiki (Black Cat), a character from Black Cat
Shiki (Samurai Shodown), a character from Samurai Shodown
Shiki Misaki, a character from The World Ends With You
Shiki Nanaya, a character from Tsukihime#Shiki Nanaya
Shiki Ryōgi, a character from Kara no Kyoukai
Senri Shiki, a character from Vampire Knight
Shiki Tohno, a character from Tsukihime
Shiki, a character from Togainu no Chi
Shiki the Golden Lion, the main antagonist of the anime movie One Piece Film: Strong World
Shiki Ando, a character from Paradox Live
Shiki Granbell, the main male protagonist from the manga and anime series Edens Zero

Japanese-language surnames
Japanese unisex given names